Glen Whisby Jr. (June 29, 1972 – September 21, 2017) was an American professional basketball player. He played college basketball at the University of Southern Mississippi.

College career
Whisby attended Brookhaven High School and played for school team. After graduation from high school, he attended University of Southern Mississippi where he played for Golden Eagles from 1991 to 1995. Whisby averaged 13.8 points per game during his career at Southern Miss, and is ninth on the all-time points list with 1,598. He was a three-time All-Metro Conference selection during his Golden Eagle career. He ranks second to Clarence Weatherspoon for career blocks (222) and ninth in scoring (1,598 points).

Professional career
Following graduation, Whisby was drafted by Fort Wayne Fury of the Continental Basketball Association in the second round (29th overall) of the 1995 CBA draft. Instead, he went overseas in 1995 to play for Gijon Baloncesto in Spain and following season, spent the summer playing for the USBL's Florida Sharks, before going back to Spain to join Estudiantes. In 1998–99, Whisby played with Pallacanestro Cantu of Italy, before heading back to Spain in 1999–00 to play for Gijon. In 2000, Whisby joined Aurora Basket Jesi of Italy.

In 2000–01, Whisby played in Russia with UNICS, and in 2001–02 he played in Turkey with Fenerbahçe. In 2002–03, he played in Poland with Polonia Warszawa and in France with JDA Dijon Basket. For the 2003–04 season he moved to Tuborg Pilsener of Turkey, then he played one season in Italian LegaDue Basket with Basket Club Ferrara, before returning to Turkey in 2005–06 to play with Galatasaray. In 2006–07, he played in France with Hyeres-Toulon. In 2008, he played with Lappeenrannan NMKY of Finland and his last club was Basketbal Pezinok of Slovakia.

Post-playing career
He worked at Seton Hill University as assistant men's basketball coach during the 2014–15 season.

Whisby died on September 22, 2017, at the age of 45 after suffering a heart attack.

References

External links
Glen Whisby at basketball-reference.com
Glen Whisby at sports-reference.com

1972 births
2017 deaths
African-American basketball players
American expatriate basketball people in Finland
American expatriate basketball people in France
American expatriate basketball people in Italy
American expatriate basketball people in Poland
American expatriate basketball people in Russia
American expatriate basketball people in Slovakia
American expatriate basketball people in Spain
American expatriate basketball people in Turkey
American men's basketball players
Basketball players from Chicago
BC UNICS players
CB Estudiantes players
Fenerbahçe men's basketball players
Galatasaray S.K. (men's basketball) players
Gijón Baloncesto players
HTV Basket players
JDA Dijon Basket players
Pallacanestro Cantù players
Polonia Warszawa (basketball) players
Southern Miss Golden Eagles basketball players
Tuborg Pilsener basketball players
Centers (basketball)
20th-century African-American sportspeople
21st-century African-American sportspeople